Philosophy & Public Affairs is a quarterly peer-reviewed academic journal published by John Wiley & Sons. It publishes philosophical articles on legal, social, and political issues. The journal was established in 1972 under the sponsorship of Princeton University Press. Blackwell (now Wiley) became the journal's publisher in 2004. The current editor-in-chief is Anna Stilz (Princeton University). According to the Journal Citation Reports, the journal has a 2020 impact factor of 2.000, ranking it 100th out of 183 journals in the category "Political Science" and 20th out of 56 journals in the category "Ethics".

See also 
 List of ethics journals
 List of philosophy journals
 List of political science journals

References

External links 
 

Philosophy journals
Wiley (publisher) academic journals
Publications established in 1971
Quarterly journals
Political science journals